"See the Funny Little Clown" is a song written and sung by Bobby Goldsboro, which he recorded on October 17, 1963 and released on November 18, 1963. In 1964, the song spent 13 weeks on the Billboard Hot 100 chart, peaking at No. 9, while reaching No. 3 on  Billboard's Middle-Road Singles chart, No. 10 on the Cash Box Top 100, and No. 30 on Canada's CHUM Hit Parade.

The song was ranked No. 90 on the Cash Box "Top 100 Chart Hits of 1964."

Background
This song deals about himself, who is hopelessly in love with a woman, even when he tried to be funny with himself, in order to attract the woman's attention. It is in the last line, that the narrator states that it is he, who is that sad and funny little clown.

Chart performance

Cover versions
Billie Jo Spears released a cover of "See the Funny Little Clown" in 1974, with her version reaching No. 80 on Billboard's Hot Country chart.

References 

1963 songs
1963 singles
Bobby Goldsboro songs
United Artists Records singles
Songs written by Bobby Goldsboro
Songs about clowns